Ply, Pli, Plies or Plying may refer to:

Common uses
 Ply (layer), typically of paper or wood
 Plywood, made of layers of wood
 Tire ply, a layer of cords embedded in the rubber of a tire

Places
 Plymouth railway station, England, station code PLY
Plymouth Municipal Airport (Indiana), IATA airport code PLY

People
 Plies (rapper), American rapper

Arts, entertainment, and media
 Ply (game theory), a turn in game play
 PLY (postnominal), a postnominal for athletes that participate in the Paralympic Games

Computing and technology
 PLY (file format) or Polygon File Format
 PLY (Python Lex-Yacc), a parsing tool for Python
 Plying, a spinning technique to make yarn